Battle vs. Chess is a computer simulation game of chess developed by Targem Games and Zuxxez Entertainment and published by TopWare Interactive.  Intending to target all major seventh-generation platforms as well as Microsoft Windows, Mac OS X and Linux, the console and computer versions were released in Europe on May 17, 2011, while the handheld versions were cancelled.

Lawsuit with Interplay
The game was not initially released in the United States due to a lawsuit by Interplay Entertainment for trademark infringement due to its similarity to their title Battle Chess. The case went to trial by jury in the summer of 2012.  In 2012, the United States District Court for the Central District of California granted a default judgment in Interplay's favor after TopWare fired its attorney and was unable to locate new counsel. On November 15, 2012, the parties settled with TopWare agreeing to pay Interplay approximately $200,000, plus interest. After the lawsuit, the game was released in North America as Check vs. Mate to avoid the Interplay trademark on planned remake of Battle Chess, through digital distribution networks including Steam.

Gameplay
Player move with the animated fantasy figurines in one of the six available environments. The white pieces are from heaven and the black pieces are from hell. The game has tutorial, multiplayer (on one device, over LAN or Internet), two campaign modes with 30 missions, the Battleground mode and various mini-games. Battle vs. Chess uses chess engine Fritz 10 to make its moves. The disadvantage is, that it has no setting of time limit, so at higher level than 6, the computer thinking tends to be long, at level 7 it can take about 15 minutes to think, at level 9 (ELO 3750) it can take few hours.

Reception
GamingBoulevard.com rated the game 80%, Eurogamer.de 90%, Gameover.gr 90%, and on Metacritic.com it has rating 69%.

References

External links
Official website 

2011 video games
Cancelled Nintendo DS games
Cancelled PlayStation Portable games
Chess software
Games for Windows certified games
Linux games
MacOS games
Multiplayer online games
PlayStation 3 games
SouthPeak Games
Video games developed in Germany
Video games developed in Russia
Wii games
Windows games
Xbox 360 games
Multiplayer and single-player video games
TopWare Interactive games
Targem Games games